Diego Fernando Moreno Quintero (born 27 February 1996), known as Diego Moreno, is a Colombiaian professional footballer who plays as a midfielder for Envigado.

Club career
On 7 January 2020, Diego Moreno signed with Marítimo.

References

External links

Living people
1996 births
People from Apartadó
Colombian footballers
Association football midfielders
Envigado F.C. players
Atlético Huila footballers
C.S. Marítimo players
Categoría Primera A players
Primeira Liga players
Campeonato de Portugal (league) players
Colombian expatriate footballers
Expatriate footballers in Portugal
Colombian expatriate sportspeople in Portugal
Sportspeople from Antioquia Department
21st-century Colombian people